Colette Hume is the Education Correspondent for BBC Wales Today as well as a network stand-in for Wales Correspondent Wyre Davies for BBC News network services.

She is originally from the North-East of England  and has previously worked for the BBC's Breakfast news programme.

References

External links
 
 

BBC newsreaders and journalists
Welsh journalists
Welsh women journalists
Living people
Year of birth missing (living people)